The Coalition for Marriage was an Australian lobby group that advocated the definition of marriage as being between a man and a woman, as found in the now superseded Marriage Amendment Act 2004.

Campaigning
The organisation had a lead role in lobbying for the "No" case - associated with the Australian Marriage Law Postal Survey. Other organisations partnering with the Coalition for Marriage, in opposition to same-sex marriage, include the Australian Catholic Bishops' Conference, the Australian Christian Lobby and Marriage Alliance.

The first Coalition for Marriage advertisement on TV featured three women and focused on the Safe Schools education program. In the ad, the womenHeidi McIvor, Cella White, and Pansy Laiask about potential gender confusion issues for children. The ad was supported by Conservative senator Cory Bernardi and by social commentator Andrew Bolt. The ad was criticised as being inaccurate and for linking the survey (and same-sex marriage in general) to Safe Schools, and by Opposition Leader, Bill Shorten who said, "Malcolm Turnbull ... gave the green light to this rubbish". Mothers of transgender children criticised the ad for bringing their children into the same-sex marriage debate.  The three women and supporters of the yes position have all commented on the responses to the ad. Minister for Environment and Energy Josh Frydenberg expressed that he "did not have a problem" with the advertisement, stating that he has "great confidence in the public's ability to make their own decisions as to whether they'll be voting yes or no". 

One of the women in the ad (Dr Lai) was threatened that she would be shot “this week” and a campaign was initiated (subsequently pulled) to revoke her medical registration.

Partners

See also
 Australian Catholic Bishops' Conference

References

External links
 Website
 Facebook
 Twitter
  First TV ad for the campaign

2017 establishments in Australia
Political advocacy groups in Australia
Organizations established in 2017
Same-sex marriage in Australia